On January 24, 2022, D'Monterrio Gibson (born ), a 24-year-old black delivery driver who was delivering packages for FedEx, was shot at. Gibson was reportedly driving a Hertz rental van bearing "Hertz markings on the side."  According to reports, Gibson had delivered a package to an incorrect address and retrieved if from a Junior Trail NE residence, after which he was chased, shot at, and injured by two men, Brandon Case and his father Gregory, in Brookhaven, Mississippi.

The event has been compared to the murder of Ahmaud Arbery in February 2020.

Brandon is being charged with aggravated assault and weapons charges and Gregory is being charged with conspiracy, though Gibson's lawyers are asking for more serious charges to be brought. The Cases were released on bond one day after being charged.

References

January 2022 crimes in the United States
2022 in Mississippi
Lincoln County, Mississippi